Bathroom Singer is  a reality television show on Sahara Filmy, named after the concept of bathroom singing. Ravi Kishan and Shibani Kashyap were the judges of the show. The show focussed more on the entertainment factor of the participants than on their singing talent.

References

External links
Official website

Filmy original programming
Indian reality television series
Singing talent shows
2007 Indian television series debuts
Television series by Optimystix Entertainment
2007 Indian television series endings